The National Wrestling Federation was a professional wrestling promotion based in Buffalo, New York from 1970 to 1974 and in New York City from 1986 to 1994. Former employees in the NWF consisted of professional wrestlers, managers, play-by-play and color commentators, announcers, interviewers and referees.

Alumni

Male wrestlers

Female wrestlers

Stables and tag teams

Managers and valets

Commentators and interviewers

References
General

Specific

External links
National Wrestling Federation alumni at Cagematch.net
National Wrestling Federation alumni at OWW.com
National Wrestling Federation alumni at Wrestlingdata.com

National Wrestling Federation alumni